Mirza Dovlet oglu Valiyev (Azerbaijani: Mirzə Dövlət oğlu Vəliyev; 1923 – 6 November 1944) was an Azerbaijani Red Army senior sergeant and a Hero of the Soviet Union. Valiyev was posthumously awarded the title for his actions in the Budapest Offensive. Commanding a 45mm anti-tank gun, he reportedly destroyed a number of German tanks after his crew was killed, and was himself killed. On 24 March 1945 Valiyev was posthumously awarded the title of Hero of the Soviet Union.

Early life 
Valiyev was born in 1923 in Yuxarı Ləgər in the Azerbaijan SSR to a peasant family. He received lower (incomplete) secondary education.

World War II 
Valiyev volunteered for the Red Army in June 1941. He became a 45mm anti-tank gunner. During his first battle, after his gun commander was killed, Valiyev reportedly took over the gun. He later became a senior sergeant and became a gun commander in the 3rd Rifle Battalion of the 309th Guards Rifle Regiment of the 109th Guards Rifle Division. Valiyev fought in the Battle of the Caucasus, the Dnieper–Carpathian Offensive, and the Belgrade Offensive. He was wounded four times during the war and received the Medal "For Courage".  In 1944, he joined the Communist Party of the Soviet Union. On 11 October 1944 he was awarded the Order of Glory 3rd class.

Valiyev fought in the Budapest Offensive in November 1944. On 6 November in Vasad  a village southeast of Budapest, the rifle battalion supported by his gun crew was attacked by German infantry reportedly supported by twenty tanks. Valiyev's crew was killed or wounded. He reportedly destroyed while alone more than three tanks, an armored personnel carrier, and a troop-carrying vehicle. Valiyev reportedly continued to fire until he was killed. He was buried in Vasad at the site of the battle. For his actions, he received the title Hero of the Soviet Union and the Order of Lenin on 24 March 1945.

A monument to Valiyev was created in Yuxarı Ləgər. A street in Qusar was named after him.

References 

1923 births
1944 deaths
Heroes of the Soviet Union
Recipients of the Order of Lenin
Soviet military personnel killed in World War II
Deaths in Hungary
Recipients of the Medal "For Courage" (Russia)
Recipients of the Order of Glory
People from Qusar District
Communist Party of the Soviet Union members